The Ghost Goes West is a 1935 British romantic comedy/fantasy film starring Robert Donat, Jean Parker, and Eugene Pallette, and directed by René Clair, his first English-language film. The film shows an Old World ghost dealing with American materialism.

Plot
In 18th century Scotland, Clan Glourie's enemy (hated even more than the English) is Clan MacClaggan. Both clan leaders send their sons to fight the English, five MacClaggans and Murdoch Glourie, who would rather spend his time kissing the lasses. At the Scottish encampment, Murdoch is outnumbered by the MacClaggans and hides behind a barrel of gunpowder. An errant Scottish cannonball ends his life, but in the afterlife, he is stranded in Limbo due to his cowardice. His now-deceased father tells him he is doomed to haunt Glourie Castle until he can get a MacClaggan to admit that one Glourie can thrash fifty MacClaggans.

In the 20th century, Peggy Martin, the daughter of a rich American businessman, persuades him to purchase the castle from Donald Glourie, who is besieged by his creditors. Donald is outraged that Mr. Martin plans to dismantle his ancestral home and reassemble it in Florida, but he is attracted to Peggy. Peggy, in the meantime, meets Murdoch, but thinks he is Donald (as they look exactly alike, seeing as they are both played by Donat). Martin hires him to supervise the reconstruction. Along with the castle goes its ghost.

On the sea voyage to America, Donald has second thoughts, and he and Martin agree to cancel their deal, but then Martin's business rival, Ed Bigelow, sees a wonderful opportunity to publicize his products, so he offers Donald $100,000 for the castle. Alarmed, Martin repurchases it for $150,000. Murdoch makes a spectral appearance before many witnesses, igniting a media frenzy, but Bigelow remains openly skeptical about the ghost. Murdoch's dalliances with other women, however, derail Donald's attempts at romance with Peggy, who still believes Murdoch is Donald.

In Florida, Martin hosts a lavish party to celebrate the castle's reassembly, but Murdoch refuses to make an appearance. Then Bigelow insults the Glouries on a radio broadcast, revealing he is a MacClaggan on his mother's side. Murdoch chases him down and forces him to admit that one Glourie can thrash fifty MacClaggans; Murdoch is finally released to join his ancestors. Peggy, having realized her mistake, reconciles with Donald.

Cast
 Robert Donat as Murdoch Glourie and Donald Glourie
 Jean Parker as Peggy Martin
 Eugene Pallette as Mr. Martin
 Elsa Lanchester as Miss Shepperton
 Ralph Bunker as Ed Bigelow
 Patricia Hilliard as Shepherdess
 Everley Gregg as Mrs. Martin
 Morton Selten as The Glourie
 Chili Bouchier as Cleopatra
 Mark Daly as Murdoch's Groom
 Herbert Lomas as Fergus
 Elliott Mason as Mrs. MacNiff
 Hay Petrie as The McLaggen
 Quentin McPhearson as Mackaye

Background 
The film is an adaptation of Eric Keown's short story "Sir Tristam Goes West", and was written by Robert E. Sherwood and Geoffrey Kerr, though Clair and Lajos Biro have been alleged by contemporary sources to have done uncredited writing on the screenplay.

This was the first of two films Clair made in England following a deal he made with producer Alexander Korda, the other being his 1938 film Break the News.

Critical response
Writing for The Spectator in 1935, Graham Greene praised the film. He wrote of how the "camera sense" of René Clair manifested itself in the film's "feeling of mobility, of visual freedom" and highlighted Clair's directorial genius. Greene also praised the acting of Pallette and Donat, describing Pallette's portrayal of an American millionaire as the finest performance of his career, and Donat's acting style as imbued with "invincible naturalness".

The Monthly Film Bulletin gave a mixed review: "If the continuity of the film appears in places rather thin, the satire occasionally a trifle obvious, and the humour sometimes a little mechanical, there are, nevertheless, some very good moments".

The Ghost Goes West was the 13th most popular film at the British box office in 1935–36. The film was voted the best British movie of 1936 by readers of Film Weekly magazine.

Both the original treatment and the cutting continuity of the finished film were published in Successful Film Writing as Illustrated by 'the Ghost Goes West' by Seton Margrave. London: Methuen & Co. Ltd., 1936.

See also
 List of ghost films
 Ballavpurer Roopkotha

References

External links
 
 
 
 
 The Ghost Goes West on Screen Guild Theater: 21 August 1944

1935 films
1935 romantic comedy films
1930s historical comedy films
1930s fantasy comedy films
1930s ghost films
British romantic comedy films
British fantasy comedy films
British black-and-white films
British ghost films
Films set in castles
Films set in Scotland
Films set in Florida
Films set in the 18th century
Films set in the 1930s
London Films films
Films directed by René Clair
Films produced by Alexander Korda
British historical comedy films
British historical romance films
Historical fantasy films
1930s British films